Alan Steven Franco Palma (born 21 August 1998) is an Ecuadorian footballer who plays as a midfielder for Argentine Primera División club Talleres, on loan from Atlético Mineiro, and the Ecuador national team.

Career

Independiente del Valle
Franco came through the youth setup at Independiente del Valle and made his professional debut as an 18-year-old in 2016. He was a first team regular by 2018 and was one of the standout performers of Independiente del Valle’s winning campaign in the 2019 Copa Sudamericana, in which he and defender Luis Segovia were the only players to start every game.

Atlético Mineiro
On 4 June 2020, Franco moved to Brazilian club Atlético Mineiro.

Loan to Charlotte FC
On 21 December 2021, Atlético Mineiro agreed to send Franco to Major League Soccer expansion club Charlotte FC on a one-year loan deal with an option to buy. On 27 June 2022, Franco's loan with Charlotte transferred to Argentinian side Talleres de Córdoba.

International career
In August 2018, Franco was called up to the Ecuador national team for the first time by manager Hernán Darío Gómez. He made his debut on 12 September 2018, in a friendly against Guatemala.

Career statistics

Club

International

International goals
Scores and results list Ecuador's goal tally first.

Honours
Independiente del Valle
Copa Sudamericana: 2019

Atlético Mineiro
Campeonato Brasileiro Série A: 2021
Copa do Brasil: 2021
Campeonato Mineiro: 2020, 2021

References

Living people
1998 births
People from Guayas Province
Ecuadorian footballers
Association football midfielders
Ecuador international footballers
C.S.D. Independiente del Valle footballers
Clube Atlético Mineiro players
Charlotte FC players
Ecuadorian Serie A players
Campeonato Brasileiro Série A players
2021 Copa América players
Ecuadorian expatriate footballers
Ecuadorian expatriate sportspeople in Brazil
Ecuadorian expatriate sportspeople in the United States
Expatriate footballers in Brazil
Expatriate soccer players in the United States
Major League Soccer players
C.S. Norte América footballers
Talleres de Córdoba footballers
2022 FIFA World Cup players